Cyrille Florent Bella (born 11 June 1975) is a Cameroonian former professional football who played as a forward.

Personal life
Bella's son Armel Bella-Kotchap is also a professional footballer for Premier League club Southampton, and an international player for Germany.

References

External links
 

1975 births
Living people
Cameroonian footballers
Association football forwards
Cameroon international footballers
Union Douala players
Cerro Porteño players
SC Paderborn 07 players
Rot Weiss Ahlen players
Rot-Weiß Oberhausen players
SV Wilhelmshaven players
Hammer SpVg players
Kitchee SC players
2. Bundesliga players
Cameroonian expatriate footballers
Cameroonian expatriate sportspeople in Germany
Expatriate footballers in Germany
Cameroonian expatriate sportspeople in Paraguay
Expatriate footballers in Paraguay
Cameroonian expatriate sportspeople in Hong Kong
Expatriate footballers in Hong Kong